Brisbane Central was an electoral division in the state of Queensland, Australia.

The electorate covered the central portion of Brisbane, including the Brisbane central business district as well as the inner suburbs of Bowen Hills, Fortitude Valley, Herston, Kelvin Grove, Spring Hill, New Farm, Newmarket and Windsor. It is bordered on the east and south by the Brisbane River.

History
The Town of Brisbane was one of the original electorates established by Order-in-Council in 1859. Since then, the name of the electorate covering what is now the CBD of Brisbane has been variously known as Brisbane City, North Brisbane, Brisbane North and Brisbane (from 1912). Brisbane Central was created in 1977 and was held from 1989 to 2007 by Labor's Peter Beattie, who was Premier of Queensland from 1998. Beattie resigned as both Premier and Member for Brisbane Central and a 2007 Brisbane Central by-election was held. The seat was won by Labor candidate Grace Grace.

In the 2017 electoral redistribution, the Electoral Commission of Queensland changed the name of the electorate to McConnel.

Members for Brisbane Central

Election results

References

External links
 Electorate profile (Antony Green, ABC)

Former electoral districts of Queensland
1977 establishments in Australia
2017 disestablishments in Australia
Constituencies established in 1977
Constituencies disestablished in 2017